The Pentagon or Brussels' city centre is the historical city centre of Brussels, Belgium, within the contours of the Small Ring inner ring road. The Small Ring is located on the site of the second walls of Brussels, which were built in the 16th century. As in most European cities, these walls were replaced by large boulevards at the end of the 19th century.

In 2013, 51,566 people lived there, mainly in the Marolles/Marollen district and west of the central boulevards. For the entire City of Brussels, there were 168,576 inhabitants; the majority living outside the Pentagon, in the northern part of the municipality.

Neighbourhoods
Neighbourhoods in the Pentagon include:
 Îlot Sacré
 Marolles/Marollen
 Sablon/Zavel
 Quays Quarter
 Royal Quarter
 Dansaert Quarter
 Freedom Quarter

References

City of Brussels